Abdulaziz bin Mohammed Al Rabban (() is a prominent Qatari businessman whose operations are based in Doha.

Biography 
Al Rabban was born and raised in Doha, and is currently one of the wealthiest men in Qatar. Though he is not directly related to anyone in the royal family, he married the daughter of a member of the royal family.

His roles in Qatar's business scene include being the CEO of Business Trading Company (BTC), the undersecretary and assistant director of the Amiri Protocol, and the former Vice President and honorary board member of the Al Sadd Sports Club in Doha. He was also a founder of the Qatari Investors Group, also referred to as the QSC Holding Company.

BTC 
Abdulaziz bin Mohammed Al Rabban is the chairman and managing director of BTC, a multi-million riyal holding and investment company that is mainly composed of project developers, focusing its efforts in real estate development projects. BTC was founded in Qatar in 1997 to offer retail complexes in the region. The Landmark Shopping Mall, built in 2000, and the Villaggio Shopping Mall, built in 2006 are the company's two most prominent retail complexes that have affected Qatar's development. These two complexes partnered with the Qatari Ministry of Interior in the public service through the use of a personal Qatari identification card with the Department of Citizenship and travel documents in its complexes, as well as the opening of the department's branches in the malls. BTC boasts itself on its connections in the State of Qatar and in the Gulf region. It has partnered with JW Marriot to develop hotels in both Doha and Bahrain, and has joint ventures with, Azadea Group, Remza-BTC, Rash Fashion, Jawad, and Cineco on its retail projects.

Emir Diwan 
Al Rabban was also involved in politics in Qatar through his work as the Diwan undersecretary of the Amiri Protocol. This protocol falls under one of the National Organizing Committees of the Second South Summit. The South Summit is the highest authority in the State of Qatar that is responsible for coordinating official meetings and conferences with the Group of 77 and China.

Controversies 
Al Rabban was implicated in the 2012 Villaggio Mall Fire incident. This mall fire occurred in the Villaggio Mall, killing 19 people, 13 of which were children. Though the fire started in the Nike store, it caused the most damage in Gympanzee daycare center. During the investigation of the incident, the daycare center was discovered to be operating without acquiring the obligatory licensing as a nursery by the ministry of social affairs. Thus, the daycare did not meet the required safety conditions, and could have prevented the casualties had this not been the case. The investigation blamed the May 2012 fire and its damages on "lack of adherence to laws, systems and measures by all concerned parties to different degrees." The owners involved were charged in Qatar, and the prosecution argued that the defendants did not comply with the necessary health and safety requirements, and that it was not licensed to operate.

In 2013, Al Rabban was found guilty of involuntary manslaughter due to negligence, and was sentenced to six years in prison. In his closing statement of the case, which lasted 5 hours, Al Rabban's defense attorney stated that his client did not have any ownership of the mall, despite his clear shareholder ties to the property. Additionally, the defense lawyers questioned why no one from the U.S. sports firm, Nike, was charged in the appeals hearing, as the fire originated from their store in the mall. Al Rabban was cleared of his charges later on, and the court deferred his sentence his company, the Qatari Company for Real Estate and Commercial Projects. In Al Rabban's retrial in April 2016, he did not appear in court, and his lawyer notified the court that his absence was due to him traveling.

Another controversy that occurred in Al Rabban's Landmark complex was his decision to remove the Christmas tree from the premise in 2008. It is unclear whether he threw it away or he chose not to feature it during the holiday season. Nonetheless, he received praise from many religious fundamentalists for his dedication to Allah's work, and for 'getting rid of evil' in the country.

Additionally, Al Rabban is married to the niece of Sheikh Thani bin Abdullah al-Thani, a member of Qatar's ruling family, the chairman and managing director of Ezdan Real Estate, the head of Tadawul Holding Group's board, and the founder of Qatari charity RAF. Al-Thani's $16 billion worth real estate firm is the largest in the MENA region in regards to its market capitalization. His holding company has accumulated capital of over $7.5 billion. He is also a large contributor and leader for prominent Islamic banks in Qatar, including the International Islamic Bank, Qatar Islamic Bank, and Masraf Al Rayan. Al Thani's charity, a semi-official Qatari government charity has been associated with terrorist organizations and terror financing. In one instance, Shafi Al Ajmi, a designated Al Nusra terrorist financier who boasted of receiving funds to prepare mujahedeen in Syria, asked donors to send money to RAF charity.

References

Living people
Qatari businesspeople
People from Doha
Year of birth missing (living people)